Black List is a 1995 Canadian thriller film. It was directed by Jean-Marc Vallée (in his feature directorial debut), written by Sylvain Guy and produced by Marcel Giroux. Black List stars Michel Côté, Geneviève Brouillette, Sylvie Bourque, André Champagne and Aubert Pallascio.

Plot
Following the trial of a judge who was found with prostitute Gabrielle Angers (Geneviève Brouillette), Gabrielle gives a list of her clients to a new judge, Jacques Savard (Michel Côté), which contains the names of some very influential judges and politicians. Dead bodies and death threats follow. Jacques' own life seems to be in danger.

Release
The film earned $1 million during its theatrical run in Quebec and $800,000 in the United States.

Reception
Black List was the highest-grossing film in Quebec in 1995. It received nine nominations at the 16th Genie Awards, which were held on January 14, 1996.

Guy subsequently wrote and directed The List, an English-language remake of Black List which was released in 2000.

Accolades

References

Works cited

External links
 
 
 
 

1995 films
Canadian thriller drama films
1990s thriller drama films
1995 directorial debut films
1995 drama films
1990s French-language films
French-language Canadian films
1990s Canadian films